Chalfant is a borough in Allegheny County, Pennsylvania, United States. The population was 748 at the 2020 census.

The borough was named after the Chalfant family of early settlers.

Geography
Chalfant is located at  (40.409968, -79.838285).

Government and politics

Surrounding neighborhoods
Chalfant has three borders, including Wilkins Township from the northeast to southeast, North Braddock to the southwest, and Forest Hills to the northwest.

Demographics

As of the census of 2000, there were 870 people, 407 households, and 234 families residing in the borough. The population density was 5,498.6 people per square mile (2,099.4/km2). There were 449 housing units at an average density of 2,837.8 per square mile (1,083.5/km2). The racial makeup of the borough was 93.45% White, 3.79% African American, 0.23% Native American, 0.69% Asian, 0.11% Pacific Islander, 0.34% from other races, and 1.38% from two or more races. Hispanic or Latino of any race were 0.46% of the population.

There were 407 households, out of which 21.6% had children under the age of 18 living with them, 40.3% were married couples living together, 11.1% had a female householder with no husband present, and 42.5% were non-families. 37.8% of all households were made up of individuals, and 14.3% had someone living alone who was 65 years of age or older. The average household size was 2.14 and the average family size was 2.85.

In the borough the population was spread out, with 18.9% under the age of 18, 7.6% from 18 to 24, 29.4% from 25 to 44, 24.5% from 45 to 64, and 19.7% who were 65 years of age or older. The median age was 41 years. For every 100 females, there were 105.7 males. For every 100 females age 18 and over, there were 97.2 males.

The median income for a household in the borough was $33,125, and the median income for a family was $46,471. Males had a median income of $28,889 versus $21,420 for females. The per capita income for the borough was $17,784. About 5.6% of families and 9.1% of the population were below the poverty line, including 17.6% of those under age 18 and 8.7% of those age 65 or over.

References

External links

 Chalfant Borough official website

Populated places established in 1901
Pittsburgh metropolitan area
Boroughs in Allegheny County, Pennsylvania
1901 establishments in Pennsylvania